Several vessels have been named Leander for one the protagonists in the story of Hero and Leander in Greek mythology.

Leander was launched in 1795 at North Shields. The Royal Navy purchased her in 1797, converted her to a bomb-vessel, and renamed her HMS Strombolo. She participated in the capture of Malta in 1800. The Navy laid her up in 1802 and had her broken up in 1809.
 was a slave ship launched on the Thames and captured in 1801.
Leander was a ship built in 1799 which was sold to Russia in 1802, and was renamed 
Leander was launched by Simon Temple, South Shields in 1800. The Royal Navy purchased her in 1803 and named her . Curlew was a sloop of 16 guns. The Navy sold her in 1810 and she returned to mercantile service as Leander. On her first voyage to the West Indies a French privateer captured her in a single-ship action; she was lost shortly thereafter.
 was launched at  Whitehaven. Initially she traded as a West Indiaman and then more widely. She was wrecked in July 1822 at the Cape of Good Hope.
 –  a clipper built in 1867
, in service with Neptun Line, Bremen, Germany until 1917
, in service with Neptun Line until 1939
 Leander G, a modern cruising superyacht

See also
 , various Royal Navy ships
 Leander class (disambiguation), three ship classes
 HMNZS Leander, a Royal New Zealand Navy light cruiser of World War II, originally HMS Leander of the British Royal Navy

Ship names